More Than Life is the fifth live praise and worship album by Hillsong United. The CD comes with a free DVD which includes documentary footage, interviews and 'behind the scenes'. The album appeared on the ARIA Albums Chart Top 100.

Track listing

Hidden features
There is an Easter egg on the DVD of a black-and-white video of Tim Hughes playing the song "Consuming Fire". To access press "Song Selection" on the main menu, move down to the song "More Than Life" then press the right arrow to highlight an X below the skateboarder. Then press select (or equivalent).

Personnel 

 Joel Houston – worship leader, acoustic guitar
 Marty Sampson – worship leader, acoustic guitar
 Tim Hughes – worship leader, acoustic guitar
 Holly Dawson – vocals
 Jonathon Douglass – vocals
 Tulele Faletolu – vocals
 Michelle Fragar – vocals
 Jad Gillies – vocals
 Kathryn DeAraujo – vocals
 Anneka Kelly – vocals
 Sam Knock – vocals
 Jess Manusama – vocals
 Katrina Peoples – vocals
 Kirsty Thornthwaite – vocals
 Michael Guy Chislett – electric guitar
 Marcus Beaumont – electric guitar
 Matt Tennikoff – bass
 Peter King – keyboards
 Peter James – keyboards
 Kevin Lee – keyboards
 Luke Munns – drums

References 

Hillsong United albums
2004 live albums
2004 video albums
Live video albums